The 2001–02 Scottish Third Division was won by Brechin City who, along with second placed Dumbarton, gained promotion to the Second Division. Queen's Park finished bottom.

Table

Scottish Third Division seasons
3
4
Scot